Wenham can refer to:

Locality
Wenham, Massachusetts, town in Essex County, Massachusetts, United States
Wenham Historic District, historic district in Wenham, Massachusetts
Hamilton/Wenham (MBTA station), Massachusetts Bay Commuter Railroad Company passenger station
Wenham Lake, lake near Wenham, Massachusetts
Wenham Lake Ice Company
Wenham, village in Carver, Massachusetts, now East Carver
Wenham Magna, Wenham Parva, Little Wenham, villages in the Babergh district of Suffolk, England

People
Alison Wenham , founder of the Association of Independent Music, later CEO of World Independent Networks 
Brian Wenham, controller of BBC Two from 1978 until 1982
David Wenham (1965–), Australian actor
David Wenham (theologian) (1945–), British theologian, son of John Wenham
Francis Herbert Wenham (1824–1908), British engineer and inventor
Gordon Wenham (1943–), English theologian
Kelly Wenham (1983–), English actress
Jane Wenham (alleged witch) (?–1730), subject of what is commonly but erroneously regarded as the last witch trial in England
Leslie Peter Wenham (1911-1990), British archaeologist, historian and professor
Jane Wenham (actress) (1927–), English actress
John Wenham (1913–1996), Anglican bible scholar, father of the theologian David Wenham
Stuart Wenham, (1957–), Australian scientist
Zoë Wenham, (1994-), British racing driver

Other
"The Witch of Wenham", 1877 poem by John Greenleaf Whittier (1807–1892)

English-language surnames